Tecoma is a genus of 14 species of shrubs or small trees. Tecoma may also refer to  the following:

Places 
 Tecoma, Victoria, the suburb of Melbourne, Victoria, Australia

People 
 Tecoma (musician), an Australian independent Roots singer-songwriter and guitarist

Transportation 
 Tecoma railway station, a railway station in Melbourne, Victoria, Australia

See also 
 Tacoma (disambiguation)
 Tahoma (disambiguation)
 Takoma (disambiguation)